Vernon Thompson is an American politician.

Thompson was a member of the Missouri House of Representatives from 1987 to 2000, when he was sentenced to one year and one day in federal prison on two counts of fraud, "for his role in stealing almost $305,000 from Kansas City and federally subsidized apartment projects." The sentence was later reduced to seven months and fifteen days. After he was released from prison, Thompson returned to the state legislature as an aide.

References

Year of birth missing (living people)
Living people
20th-century American politicians
African-American state legislators in Missouri
Democratic Party members of the Missouri House of Representatives
American politicians convicted of fraud
Missouri politicians convicted of crimes
Prisoners and detainees of the United States federal government